Bains-sur-Oust (literally Bains on Oust; , Gallo: Bein) is a commune in the Ille-et-Vilaine departement in Brittany in northwestern France.

Population
Inhabitants of Bains-sur-Oust are called Bainsois in French.

Personalities
 Nominoe, first Duke of Brittany

See also
Communes of the Ille-et-Vilaine department

References

External links

Official website 

Mayors of Ille-et-Vilaine Association 

Communes of Ille-et-Vilaine